Chorizo negrense, also known as chorizo de Bacólod, is a Filipino smoked pork sausage originating from Bacolod, Negros. It comes in two flavors: hamonado (sweet) and recado (garlicky). It can be prepared smoked in a casing (known as tsorisong bilog), or prepared fresh without the casing (known as tsorisong pudpod). It is made with ground pork, vinegar, garlic, calamansi, soy sauce, black pepper, and coarse salt. Sugar is added to the hamonado version.

See also
Chorizo de Cebu
 List of sausages

References

Philippine sausages